Chhayavad (approximated in English as "Romanticism", literally "Shaded") refers to the era of Neo-romanticism in Hindi literature, particularly Hindi poetry, 1922–1938, and was marked by an increase of romantic and humanist content. Chhayavad was marked by a renewed sense of the self and personal expression, visible in the writings of the time. It is known for its leaning towards themes of love and nature, as well as an individualistic reappropriation of the Indian tradition in a new form of mysticism, expressed through a subjective voice.

Period
Chhayavad Yug dates from 1918 to 1937. It was preceded by Bharatendu Yug (1868–1900) and Dwivedi Yug (1900–1918) and was followed by the Contemporary Period from 1937 onward.

Chhayavad continued until the latter half of the 1930s, when the golden era of modern Hindi poetry was gradually replaced by social didacticism inspired by rising nationalist fervour. Some of the later poets of this era, like Dinkar, Mahadevi and Bachchan took nationalist and social critiquing within their poetry.

Notable authors 
Jaishankar Prasad, Suryakant Tripathi 'Nirala', Sumitranandan Pant and Mahadevi Varma are considered as the four pillars of the Chhayavadi school of Hindi literature. Other important figures of this literary movement were Ramdhari Singh 'Dinkar', Harivansh Rai Bachchan, Makhanlal Chaturvedi and Pandit Narendra Sharma.

Harivansh Rai Bachchan became excessively critical of Chhayavad later in his career and was associated with other genres like Rahasyavaad, Pragativaad and Haalaavaad.

Notable works 
Jaishankar Prasad's Kamayani (1936) is considered an important work of this school, followed by Mahadevi Varma's Nihar (Mist, 1930) and Harivansh Rai Bachchan's Madhushala (1935).

Criticism of Chhayavad 
Initially, Chhayavad was very well received by readers and critics alike. However, subsequent scholars have criticized Chhayavad for excessive use of decorative language, romanticism aloof from contemporary social and economic malaise, and setting stricter rules on meter and rhyme.

Notes

References
 Romantic Poetry in the Era of Convention
 Chhayavad study in The Journal of the American Oriental Society, Jul 1, 2001
1 Now available in Vani Prakashan, New Delhi

Hindi literary movements
Neo-romanticism
20th-century Indian literature